Doris Thalmer (20 July 1907 – 9 October 1998) was a German actress. She appeared in more than 75 films and television shows between 1931 and 1992.

Selected filmography
 Eight Girls in a Boat (1932)
 Anna and Elizabeth (1933)
 Intrigue and Love (1959)
 Bear Ye One Another's Burden (1988)

References

External links

1907 births
1998 deaths
German film actresses
Actors from Frankfurt